The Amateur Championship (sometimes referred to as the British Amateur or British Amateur Championship outside the UK) is a golf tournament which has been held annually in the United Kingdom since 1885 except during the two World Wars, and in 1949 and 2019  when Ireland hosted the championship. It is one of the two leading individual tournaments for amateur golfers, alongside the U.S. Amateur. It normally has the widest international representation of any individual amateur event, with 38 golf federations from all six continents represented in the 2018 championship.

Before World War II it was regarded as one of golf's major championships, but given the modern dominance of the sport by professional golfers, this is no longer the case. Two Amateur Championship winners in the post-World War II era have gone on to win professional major championships: José María Olazábal and Sergio García, both Spaniards.

History

The inaugural tournament  was organised by the Royal Liverpool Golf Club in 1885. It was played on 20, 21 and 23 April and was "open to all amateur members of recognised golf clubs". The format was match-play. All players were included in the draw for each round, any extra player receiving a bye. If a match was halved after the 18 holes both players progressed to the next round, playing each other again. There were 49 entries from 12 different clubs, although only 44 were included in the draw and four of these players did not turn up. Of the 22 first-round matches, 2 were halved, meaning that there were 12 matches in the second round. There were no more halved matches in the following rounds which meant that 3 players reached the semi-final stage. John Ball beat his father, also called John, in the third round. Allan Macfie received a bye at the semi-final stage with Horace Hutchinson beating Ball 2 up in the only semi-final match. After his morning round, Hutchinson played badly in the afternoon and Macfie won 7&6. Each player paid a 1 guinea entry fee. This, together with 25 guineas from the Royal Liverpool club, was used for prizes. The losing finalist received £10 with the remainder being used to buy plate for the winner. The final amount for the winner was about £60 or £70. By comparison the winner of the 1885 Open Championship received £10. For many years the 1885 event was not regarded as the first Amateur Championship. It was only in 1922 that the Royal and Ancient Golf Club of St Andrews decided "to place on record the name of Mr. A. F. Macfie as the winner of the Amateur Championship of 1885".

Despite the unusual format of the 1885 event, it was regarded as a success. A meeting was arranged in 1886 at which it was decided to start an amateur championship, to be held alternately at St Andrews, Hoylake and Prestwick. A number of clubs subscribed to buy a perpetual trophy for the championship. In addition, gold and silver medals were presented to the winner and runner-up, with bronze medals for the losing semi-finalists. The format became a simple knockout, with extra holes played in the event of a tie after 18 holes. Otherwise the format remained the same as for the 1885 event. Because of the late arrangements the inaugural championship was not held until late September. With 42 entries, six rounds were needed which were completed in three days with the semi-finals and final on the last day. John Ball again lost in the semi-finals, 7&6 to Henry Lamb, but Lamb lost the final against Horace Hutchinson by the same score.

Entry, format
Entry to the Championship is now given to the most-qualified 288 applicants from around the world, with perhaps half the places reserved for top players from the United Kingdom and Ireland. Qualifying rounds for all players were first introduced in 1983, when the popularity of the championship led to the number of applicants increasing to unmanageable levels. Major golf nations are allocated entries on what amounts to a quota basis for their top applicants, with each applicant's national federation cooperating with the R&A on selection. For example, the 2010 entry list included players from the British Isles (England, Wales, Scotland, Ireland, Northern Ireland), mainland Europe (France, Belgium, Netherlands, Germany, Italy, Spain, Portugal, Sweden, Norway, Finland, Denmark, Slovenia, Switzerland, Austria, Iceland), North America (USA, Canada, Mexico), South America (Argentina, Bolivia, Peru), Asia (China, India, South Korea, Japan, Singapore), Australasia (Australia, New Zealand) and Africa (South Africa).

The first stage of the Championship involves 288 players, each of whom plays two rounds of 18 holes, one on each of two courses, over the first two days. The 64 lowest scores over the 36 holes, and ties for 64th place compete in the match play stage of the Championship, on the event's principal course, and are seeded by qualifying scores. Each match consists of one round of 18 holes, except for the Final, which is over 36 holes. Since there are generally more than 64 qualifiers from the stroke play stage, the first round of the match play involves a small number of matches to reduce the number of qualifiers to exactly 64. Tied matches are broken by sudden death over extra holes. The event is played in June, normally with a Monday to Saturday schedule.

The winner receives invitations to three of the major championships, namely the following month's Open Championship, and the following year's Masters Tournament and U.S. Open provided he remain an amateur prior to each major. The Amateur Championship is open to amateur golfers of any nationality in good standing with their national federations. Briton John Ball won the most career titles, with eight. Ball was still competing in the event as late as 1921 at Royal Liverpool Golf Club. In modern times, Briton Michael Bonallack's five titles lead. The most famous American winner of the competition was Bobby Jones, whose 1930 victory was part of his Grand Slam.

Results

Multiple winners
Sixteen players have won more than one Amateur Championship, as of 2022:

8 wins: John Ball
5 wins: Michael Bonallack
4 wins: Harold Hilton
3 wins: Joe Carr
2 wins: Horace Hutchinson, Johnny Laidlay, Freddie Tait, Robert Maxwell, Ernest Holderness, Cyril Tolley, Lawson Little, Frank Stranahan, Trevor Homer, Dick Siderowf, Peter McEvoy, Gary Wolstenholme

Three players have won both the Amateur and the Open Championship:
John Ball – 1888, 1890, 1892, 1894, 1899, 1907, 1910, 1912 Amateurs; 1890 Open
Harold Hilton – 1900, 1901, 1911, 1913 Amateurs; 1892, 1897 Opens
Bobby Jones – 1930 Amateur; 1926, 1927, 1930 Opens

Stroke-play qualifying
Stroke-play qualifying was introduced in 1983. 36 holes are played, using two courses, with the leading 64 and ties advancing to the match-play stage. From 1983 to 1985 exactly 64 players qualified, ties for the final places being decided on countback. In 2020 qualifying was reduced to one round. The leading qualifiers are given below:

1983 Philip Parkin (140)
1984 Philip Parkin (141)
1985 Dana Banke (137)
1986 Dana Banke (142)
1987 Andrew Hare (136)
1988 Stephen Dodd+, Liam McNamara (145)
1989 Jim Milligan (141)
1990 Adam Hart (138)
1991 Fredrik Andersson, David Duval+ (141)
1992 Michael Welch (148)
1993 Craig Watson (141)
1994 Stephen Gallacher (145)
1995 Gary Clark (139)
1996 Warren Bladon+, Jody Fanagan (138)
1997 Matt Carver (145)
1998 Mark Hilton (137)
1999 Simon Dyson (139)
2000 Tim Rice+, Michael Thannhäuser (139)
2001 Nick Dougherty (135)
2002 Richard Finch (137)
2003 David Inglis (134)
2004 James Heath+, Kevin McAlpine (135)
2005 Damian Ulrich (135)
2006 Llewellyn Matthews (142)
2007 David Horsey (132)
2008 Sam Hutsby (139)
2009 Matteo Manassero (135)
2010 Tommy Fleetwood (135)
2011 Greg Eason (139)
2012 Daniel Jennevret (136)
2013 Craig Hinton, Adrian Meronk+ (140)
2014 Dan Brown (133)
2015 Ryan Chisnall, Craig Howie+ (135)
2016 Connor Syme (136)
2017 Caolan Rafferty (132)
2018 Wilco Nienaber (133)
2019 John Axelsen, Thomas Plumb+ (139)
2020 Ruben Lindsay (67)
2021 Matthew Clark (134)
2022 Jonothan Broomhead+, Barclay Brown (135)

+ Number one seed. If two or more players are tied, the seeding is decided on countback using the combined scores on the last 9 holes of both qualifying rounds.

Host courses
The Amateur has been played at the following courses, listed in order of number of tournaments hosted (as of 2022):
18 Royal Liverpool Golf Club
16 St Andrews Links
14 Royal St George's Golf Club
11 Prestwick Golf Club
11 Muirfield
7 Royal Porthcawl Golf Club
6 Royal Troon Golf Club
5 Carnoustie Golf Links, Royal Lytham & St Annes Golf Club
4 Formby Golf Club, Turnberry Golf Club, Royal Birkdale Golf Club, 
3 Royal Cinque Ports Golf Club, Ganton Golf Club, Royal Portrush Golf Club, Royal North Devon Golf Club
2 Royal County Down Golf Club, Hillside Golf Club, Portmarnock Golf Club, Nairn Golf Club
1 Royal Aberdeen Golf Club,  Royal Dornoch Golf Club

Future sites
 2023 – Hillside Golf Club and Southport and Ainsdale Golf Club
 2024 – Ballyliffin Golf Club

References

External links

Amateur golf tournaments in the United Kingdom
R&A championships
Recurring events established in 1885
1885 establishments in England
Annual sporting events in the United Kingdom
Amateur sport in the United Kingdom
National championships in the United Kingdom